The following events occurred in February 1977:

February 1, 1977 (Tuesday)
Françoise Claustre, a French archaeologist who had been a hostage of rebels in Chad for almost three years, returned to France days after being set free. She had been captured near Bardai on April 20, 1974. Returning as well was her husband, Pierre Claustre, who had been captured by the rebels in August, 1975, while he had been trying to negotiate the release of Françoise. Upon their arrival, Françoise and Pierre were admitted to a hospital in Toulouse for an evaluation of their health. "The World", Los Angeles Times, February 2, 1977, p. I-1
The Indian Coast Guard, part of the nation's Ministry of Defence, was established as a maritime law enforcement and search and rescue agency  with jurisdiction over India's territorial waters.
Died: David E. Finley Jr., 86, American cultural leader who led the Roberts Commission during World War II to rescue war-threatened art works, as well as founding the National Portrait Gallery and the National Trust for Historic Preservation.

February 2, 1977 (Wednesday)

The Congress Party of India, led by Prime Minister Indira Gandhi, was split as Agriculture Minister Jagjivan Ram and four other members of her cabinet resigned  to form the  Congress for Democracy Party, which would later merge with the Janata Party.
Born: Shakira (stage name for Shakira Isabel Mebarak), Colombian vocalist and songwriter, bestselling Latin music singer and three-time Grammy Award winner; in Barranquilla

February 3, 1977 (Thursday)

Lieutenant General Tafari Benti, Ethiopia's nominal head of state as Chairman of the Central Committee of the Derg, the ruling 40-member military council, was executed along with six other Derg members after a gun battle between rival factions during a meeting in Addis Ababa.  The Derg's First Vice Chairman, Mengistu Haile Mariam, announced afterward that Benti and the other six (who included Secretary-General Almayahu Haile ad Information Minister Asrat Desta) had been exposed as supporters of the "counter-revolutionary" Ethiopian People's Revolutionary Party. Mengistu then became the new Chairman of the Derg. Benti's deputy chairman, Atnafu Abate, had not been present at the meeting and would remain part of the Derg until his own arrest and execution on November 12.
A blizzard in northern Japan killed 18 people whose houses collapsed under the weight of the snow on their roofs, while 13 others froze to death. The storm, blowing southward from Siberia, demolished 90 houses. 
Born: Daddy Yankee (stage name for Ramón Luis Ayala), Puerto Rican American rapper known as the "King of Reggaeton"; in San Juan 
Died: Pauline Starke, 76, American silent film actress

February 4, 1977 (Friday)
In the U.S., the derailment of an elevated train in Chicago killed 11 commuters and injured 183 others. At about 5:30 p.m., the 8-car train rear-ended a  6-car train ahead of it in an accident attributed to human error. Two crowded cars plunged  from the "EL" tracks into the intersection of Wabash Avenue and Lake Street. 
Died: Brett Halliday, 72, American author of the Michael Shayne mystery novels (as Davis Dresser)

February 5, 1977 (Saturday)
In the east African nation of Tanzania (a union of Tanganyika on the mainland and the islands of Zanzibar), the Chama Cha Mapinduzi (CCM) political party was created with the merger of the Tanganyika African National Union (TANU) of President Julius Nyerere and Zanzibar's Afro-Shirazi Party in an elaborate ceremony in Zanzibar City. Chama Cha Mapinduzi was a Swahili language translation of the words for a political party ("chama") and for "revolution" ("mapinduzi").
Born: Ben Ainslie, British sport sailing competitor, Olympic gold medalist 2000, 2004, 2008 and 2012, and 11-time world champion; in Macclesfield, Cheshire 
Died: 
Oskar Klein, 82, Swedish theoretical physicist
William J. Crum, 58, U.S. businessman who was a major part of black market operations during the Vietnam War through his Tradewell Company that had exclusive contracts to supply the Post Exchange (PX) on individual bases overseas through a program of kickbacks and bribery, died in a fire at his apartment in Hong Kong.

February 6, 1977 (Sunday)
The Silver Jubilee of Elizabeth II, a year-long celebration of the 25th anniversary of the accession (on February 6, 1952) of Queen Elizabeth II to the British throne, opened with church services across Britain to recognize the 25th anniversary of the death of King George VI.  Four days later, the Queen began her visit to Southern Pacific nations within the British Commonwealth which recognized her as their reigning monarch, starting with Fiji (February 16 and 17), New Zealand (February 22 to March 7), Australia (March 7 to March 23), and Papua New Guinea (March 23 and 25). 
In Canada, René Lévesque, the pro-independence Premier of Quebec, accidentally killed Edgar Trottier while driving his car. Trottier was a homeless man who had been "lying in the middle of McDougall road, near Cedar Ave." at 4:15 in the morning, while Premier Lévesque was driving his secretary in her car after a late night visit to the home of newspaper editor Yves Michaud. Lévesque slammed on the brakes but struck Trottier and the car dragged the victim  as it slid on a downhill slope.  Lévesque, the province's head of government, was fined $25 for not wearing his glasses as required by his license.  
In Rhodesia (now Zimbabwe) a group of guerrillas killed seven white missionaries in an attack the St. Paul's High School in Chisipite, a suburb of the Rhodesian capital of Salisbury (now Harare). 
Born: Ali Seezan, Maldivian film producer; in Malé
Died: Gustave Gilbert, 65, American psychologist and author known for his book The Psychology of Dictatorship, a psychohistorical study of Adolf Hitler

February 7, 1977 (Monday)
The Soviet Union launched Soyuz 24 with Viktor Gorbatko and Yury Glazkov to dock with the Salyut 5 space station. 
Born: Mariusz Pudzianowski, Polish strongman strength athlete and mixed martial artist; winner of the World's Strongest Man title in 2002, 2003, 2005, 2007, and 2008; in Biala Rawska

February 8, 1977 (Tuesday)
Convicted West German terrorist Brigitte Mohnhaupt of the Red Army Faction was paroled from Stammheim Prison after serving time for a 1972 conviction. Mohnhaupt returned to her activities with the Faction and would help carry out the April 7 assassination of West Germany's Chief Prosecutor, Siegfried Buback less than two months later, on April 7.
Speaking on behalf of the Government of the United Kingdom,  Samuel Silkin, the Attorney General for England and Wales and for Northern Ireland, informed the European Court of Human Rights in the case of Ireland v. the United Kingdom that the Government would not reintroduce the five techniques of torture, banned in 1972, as an aid to interrogation of prisoners. Edward Heath, Prime Minister at the time, had announced on March 2, 1972 that the five techniques (prolonged wall-standing, hooding, loud noise, sleep deprivation and food deprivation) would not be used again.  
Voting was held in the United States and in Canada among 1.4 million steelworkers for the president of the United Steelworkers of America labor union. Lloyd McBride and Ed Sadlowski were the two candidates for the USWA leadership. 
In the U.S. state of Ohio, Larry Flynt, publisher of the pornographic magazine Hustler was convicted by the Court of Common Pleas for Hamilton County, Ohio (in Cincinnati) of pandering obscenity and of engaging in "organized crime" as defined by a new Ohio law. Flynt was sentenced by Judge William J. Morrisey to at least 7 years in prison and no more than 25, and made plans to appeal the constitutionality of the law. 
Born: Jim Carrington, English author of children's literature known for the Otis the Robot series and the Sang Kancil series; in Norwich, Norfolk

February 9, 1977 (Wednesday)

Queen Alia of Jordan, the 28-year-old wife of King Hussein and queen consort since their marriage in 1972, was killed in a helicopter crash, along with Health Minister Mohammed al‐Beshir, the pilot and a Jordanian Air Force medic. Queen Alia and al-Beshir were returning to Amman after an inspection trip to Tafilah when their helicopter went down in a violent rainstorm. King Hussein went on nationwide radio to personally announce his wife's death. 
Spain and the Soviet Union re-established diplomatic relations almost 40 years after terminating them following the 1937 victory of the late Francisco Franco over the Spain's left-wing Republican government. Prior to the break in relations, Spain's government had shipped 510 tons of gold to Russia for safekeeping. 

Died: Sergey Ilyushin, 82, Soviet Russian aircraft designer who founded the government-owned Ilyushin Design Bureau in 1933. He designed the Ilyushin Il-2 single engine ground-attack warplane, the single most-often produced military aircraft design in aviation history (with 42,330 produced), and later worked on the team creating  what was once the largest capacity jet airliner, the 200-seat Ilyushin Il-62.

February 10, 1977 (Thursday)

Soviet physicist and human rights activist Yuri Orlov, who had organized the Moscow Helsinki Group to document Soviet violations of the human rights provisions of the 1975 Helsinki accords was arrested on charges of failing to disband an anti-government group.   Orlov would be sentenced on May 15, 1978, to seven years imprisonment in a labor camp and five years of internal exile in Siberia, before being released in 1986.
In Sri Lanka, a group of four Tamil  members of parliament— K. P. Ratnam, Appapillai Amirthalingam, V. N. Navaratnam and Kathiripillai Thurairatnam— were acquitted of charges of sedition after having been arrested on May 21, 1976. 
The White House announced that U.S. President Jimmy Carter would answer questions from random callers on March 5, 1977, in a live CBS Radio Network broadcast of a show titled "Ask President Carter". 
American insurance company executive Arthur L. Williams Jr. founded Primerica Financial Services as the A. L. Williams Corporation.
Born: Shahin Novrasli, Azerbaijani jazz pianist and classical music composer; in Baku, Azerbaijani SSR, Soviet Union
Died: Frank "The Bomp" Bompensiero, 70, American organized crime figure who served as the caporegime for the Los Angeles Mafia and as a hitman, was shot to death on orders of mob boss Dominic Brooklier while walking home in San Diego.  Brooklier had ordered the killing after discovering that Bompensiero had become an FBI informant. Another mob associate, Thomas Ricciardi, would be charged with the murder but would die of heart disease before the trial could begin.

February 11, 1977 (Friday)

Fakhruddin Ali Ahmed, the 5th President of India and head of state of the nation since 1974, died of a heart attack the day after returning early from a state visit to Malaysia because of illness.  President Ahmed was found unresponsive after having suffered a fatal heart attack while taking a bath at the Rashtrapati Bhavan, the presidential palace in Delhi. Vice President B. D. Jatti was sworn into office hours later as the Acting President of India until an election could be held in July. The U.S. delegation to the funeral was led by the Lillian Carter, the 78-year-old mother of President Jimmy Carter; Mrs. Carter had served as a Peace Corps volunteer in India 10 years earlier. 
Born: Mike Shinoda, American singer and co-founder of the band Linkin Park; in Panorama City neighborhood of Los Angeles

February 12, 1977 (Saturday)
In the West African nation of Guinea, three former cabinet ministers of President Sékou Touré were placed on a "black diet" ("diete noire") at the prison camp in Camp Boiro, a means of gradually starving them to death. Justice Minister Diallo Telli (who had been the first president of the Organization of African Unity), Trade Minister Alpha Oumar Barry, and Planning Minister Alioune Dramé had all been arrested on July 12, 1976, along with military officers Lamine Kouyaté and Alassane Diallo, on charges of planning a coup. All five were dead in less than three weeks, with Dramé dying on March 1.
Greek Cypriot leader Archbishop Makarios III and Turkish Cypriot leader Rauf Denktash met for four hours at the invitation of U.N. Secretary General Kurt Waldheim, and agreed to resume peace negotiations in war-torn Cyprus. The meeting took place in the Cypriot capital of Nicosia and lasted four hours. 
The Gallup Poll determined that drinking of liquor in the United States was at the highest level it had been since the late 1930s, with 71% of adults drinking alcoholic beverages, and the percentage of people reporting family trouble from liquor abuse increasing to 18%, compared to 12% in 1974. "Drinking Hits 38-Year Peak, Poll Finds", Los Angeles Times,  February 13, 1977, p.I-2
Born: Galina Dodon, First Lady of the Republic of Moldova from 2016 to 2020; in Molovata, Moldavian SSR, Soviet Union 
Died: 
Wang Dulu (pen name for Wang Baoxiang), 68, Chinese mystery, science fiction and romance novelist. His 1942 Crouching Tiger, Hidden Dragon, which would later become the basis for a successful 2000 film of the same name 
Mary Callery, 73, American abstract expressionist sculptor

February 13, 1977 (Sunday)
Qantas became the first airline to fly passengers over the continent of Antarctica, with a special charter flight organized by Australian aviator and entrepreneur Dick Smith. The charter, made on a Boeing 747-200B that departed from Sydney, took guests on a sightseeing tour before returning to Sydney. Air New Zealand made its own charter flight to Antarctica two days later. Both airlines would make multiple flights until the crash of a an Air New Zealand flight on November 28, 1979, killing all 257 people on board.

February 14, 1977 (Monday)
The B-52's, a U.S. new wave music band, formed by a group of friends in Athens, Georgia, played their first concert together, for a Valentine's Day concert.
Born: 
François Perrodo, French oil and gas billionaire and chairman of Perenco, collector of automobiles; to French parents in Singapore
Cadel Evans, Australian professional cyclist, 2011 Tour de France and 2010 Giro d'Italia winner; in Katherine, Northern Territory 
Jim Jefferies (stage name for Geoff James Nugent), Australian-born comedian; in Sydney
Died: Joseph Moncure March, 77, American poet known for two book-length narrative poems, The Wild Party (1926) and The Set-Up (1928)

February 15, 1977 (Tuesday)
Died: H. J. Lam, 85, Dutch botanist for whom the lamiodendron species of flowering plants is named

February 16, 1977 (Wednesday)
Died: 
Rózsa Péter, 51, Hungarian mathematician and co-founder of computability theory and the first woman to be elected to the Hungarian Academy of Sciences. She died of an illness one day before her 52nd birthday.
Carlos Pellicer, 80, Mexican poet

February 17, 1977 (Thursday)
In Indonesia, Mayora, one of the world's largest food and beverage companies, was founded in Tangerang by Jogi Hendra Atmadja, an immigrant from Iran. 
Helen Brach, the 65-year-old multimillonaire heiress to the Brach's candy company fortune, disappeared after a routine checkup at the Mayo Clinic in Rochester, Minnesota. Mrs. Brach had planned to fly in a commercial airliner to her home near Chicago, but did not show up for the flight. She was not seen in public again, and her fate remained unknown to investigators more than 40 years later. She would be declared legally dead by a court in 1984.

February 18, 1977 (Friday)
The first test flight of the American space shuttle program took place as the Space Shuttle Enterprise was attached to the Shuttle Carrier Aircraft, a Boeing 747 jet airplane designed to carry the spacecraft. The shuttle carrier took off from Edwards Air Force Base as part of the evaluation of the shuttle's aerodynamics and then landed again. 
Born: 
László Nemes, Hungarian film director and screenwriter known for Son of Saul; in Budapest
Ike Barinholtz, American comedian and TV actor known for MADtv and The Mindy Project; in the Rogers Park neighborhood of Chicago

February 19, 1977 (Saturday)
Born: Gianluca Zambrotta, Italian footballer and right-back with 98 caps for the Italy national team; in Como, Lombardy

February 20, 1977 (Sunday)
Born: 
Gail Kim, Canadian-born American professional wrestler and WWE Diva champion; in Toronto 
Stephon Marbury, American National Basketball Association basketball player 1996 to 2009, Chinese Basketball Association player 2010 to 2019 and head coach 2019 to present; in Coney Island neighborhood of Brooklyn

February 21, 1977 (Monday)
Born: 
Steve Francis, U.S. NBA basketball point guard, co-winner of the 1999-2000 Rookie of the Year award; in Takoma Park, Maryland
Cyrine Abdelnour, Lebanese singer, actress and model; in Abadiyeh
Jonathan Safran Foer, American novelist; in Washington, D.C.

February 22, 1977 (Tuesday)
Born: Hakan Yakin, Swiss footballer and midfielder with 87 caps for the Switzerland national team; to Turkish parents in Basel

February 23, 1977 (Wednesday)
Óscar Romero, an outspoken opponent of violence, became the Roman Catholic Archbishop of San Salvador in El Salvador.
Born: Kristina Šmigun-Vähi, Estonian cross-country skier and 2006 Olympic gold medalist; in Tartu, Estonian SSR, Soviet Union

February 24, 1977 (Thursday)
Born: Floyd Mayweather Jr., American professional boxer and NASCAR team owner; WBC superfeatherweight champion 1998-2002; WBC lightweight champion 2002-2005; WBC and IBF super lightweight champion 2005-2007; IBF, IBO and WBC welterweight champ 2006-2007; WBC light middleweight champion 2007-2011; WBA super light middleweight champ 2012-2015; WBA, WBC and WBO welterweight champ 2015-2017; as Floyd Joy Sinclair in Grand Rapids, Michigan

February 25, 1977 (Friday)
A fire that broke out on the 13th floor of Moscow's Rossiya Hotel killed 42 guests and employees, and injured 52 others. At the time, the Rossiya was the largest in the world with 3,182 rooms. The number of casualties was exacerbated by the lack of enough exits in the hotel. 
The first parliamentary voting in more than 12 years was held in Algeria for the Majlis. Although the National Liberation Front was the only legal political party, there were 783 candidates for the 261 seats. 
The Soviet Soyuz 24 space mission returned to earth with cosmonauts Viktor Gorbatko and Yuri Glazkov, after 17 days in space and the reactivation of the orbiting Salyut space station for the first time in six months.
Died: 
Patricia Haines, 45, English TV actress, died of lung cancer
Tahjar Ederis (professional name for The Teng Chun), Indonesian film producer
Tewodros Bekele, Ethiopian labor union organizer and founder weeks earlier of the All-Ethiopia Trade Union (AETU), was assassinated.

February 26, 1977 (Saturday)
The Union of Ethiopian Marxist–Leninist Organizations (known by its Amharic language acronym Imaledih) was founded by the merger of five Communist organizations, the All-Ethiopian Socialist Movement (Meison), the Ethiopian Oppressed People's Revolutionary Struggle (Ichat), the Ethiopian Marxist-Leninist Revolutionary Organization (Malerid), the Waz League and Revolutionary Flame (Seded). 
Born: 
Shane Williams, Welsh rugby union player with 87 appearances for the Wales national team, 2008 World Rugby Player of the Year; in Morriston, Swansea
James Wan, Malaysian-born Australian director and screenwriter
Koxie (stage name for Laure Cohen), French pop singer; in Neuilly-sur-Seine, Hauts-de-Seine département
Died: 
Lotte Neumann (stage name for Charlotte Pötler), 80, German film actress and screenwriter 
Allison Hayes, 46, American film and TV actress and model, died of leukemia.

February 27, 1977 (Sunday)
Died: John Dickson Carr, 70, American mystery novelist known for the Gideon Fell series of 23 books (1933-1967) and (under the pen name Carter Dickson), the Sir Henry Merrivale mysteries from 1934 to 1953

February 28, 1977 (Monday)
Queen Elizabeth II of the United Kingdom, acting in her capacity as Queen of New Zealand, opened the nation's Parliament as part of her tour of the British Commonwealth of Nations.
Born: 
Jason Aldean (stage name for Jason Aldine Williams), American country music singer; in Macon, Georgia 
Rafael Amaya, award-winning Mexican TV actor known for El Señor de los Cielos; in Hermosillo, Sonora state

References

1977
1977-02
1977-02